The Roman Catholic Diocese of Xai-Xai is a diocese located in the city of Xai-Xai in the Ecclesiastical Province of Maputo in Mozambique.

History
 19 June 1970: Established as Diocese of João Belo from the Metropolitan Archdiocese of Lourenço Marques
 1 October 1976: Renamed as Diocese of Xai-Xai

Special churches
The cathedral is the Catedral São João Baptista (Cathedral of St. John the Baptist) in Xai-Xai.

Leadership

Bishops of João Belo
 Félix Niza Ribeiro (1972-1976)

Bishops of Xai-Xai
 Júlio Duarte Langa (1976 – 2004) (made a cardinal in 2015)
 Lucio Andrice Muandula (2004 – present)

Auxiliary Bishops
Alberto Vera Aréjula, O. de M. (2015 – 2018), appointed Bishop of Nacala

See also
Roman Catholicism in Mozambique

References

External links
 GCatholic.org
 Catholic Hierarchy

Xai-Xai
Christian organizations established in 1970
Roman Catholic dioceses and prelatures established in the 20th century
1970 establishments in Mozambique
Roman Catholic Ecclesiastical Province of Maputo